Thomas Saisi (19 July 1945 – 31 March 2021) was a Kenyan 800 metres runner who finished seventh at the 1968 Summer Olympics in Mexico City. He also competed at the 1972 Summer Olympics.

His personal best time was 1.46.3 minutes, achieved in September 1971 in Munich.

References

External links

1945 births
2021 deaths
Kenyan male middle-distance runners
Athletes (track and field) at the 1968 Summer Olympics
Athletes (track and field) at the 1970 British Commonwealth Games
Athletes (track and field) at the 1972 Summer Olympics
Olympic athletes of Kenya
Commonwealth Games competitors for Kenya